Iozzi is an Italian surname. Notable people with the surname include:

Alessandra Iozzi (born 1959), Italian-American-Swiss mathematician
Monica Iozzi (born 1981), Brazilian actress and reporter

See also
Rozzi

Italian-language surnames